The Valea Mare is a right tributary of the river Almaș in Romania. It flows into the Almaș in Pogănești.

References

Rivers of Romania
Rivers of Hunedoara County